Royal Caribbean International (RCI), also formerly known as Royal Caribbean Cruise Line (RCCL), is a cruise line brand founded in 1968 in Norway and organised as a wholly owned subsidiary of Royal Caribbean Group since 1997. Based in Miami, Florida. It is the largest cruise line by revenue and second largest by passengers counts. In 2018, Royal Caribbean International controlled 19.2% of the worldwide cruise market by passengers and 14.0% by revenue. It operates the five largest passenger ships in the world. As of January 2022, the line operates twenty-six ships and has four additional ships on order.

History

Royal Caribbean Cruise Line was founded in 1968 by three Norwegian shipping companies: Anders Wilhelmsen & Company, I.M. Skaugen & Company, and Gotaas Larsen.  The newly created line put its first ship, Song of Norway, into service two years later. A year later, the line added Nordic Prince to the fleet and in 1972 it added Sun Viking. In 1978, Song of Norway became Royal Caribbean's first passenger ship to be lengthened. This was accomplished via the insertion of an  section to the vessel's severed center. Following the success of this work, Nordic Prince was also stretched in 1980. During the stretching of both ships, their sterns were modified to create more open space, however Sun Viking was neither stretched nor modified. In 1982, Royal Caribbean  launched Song of America, over twice the size of Sun Viking and at the time the third largest passenger vessel afloat (after Norway and Queen Elizabeth 2).

In 1986, Royal Caribbean leased a coastal property in Labadie, Haiti, to be used as a private destination for its guests, renamed as Labadee. After a corporate restructuring in 1988, the line launched Sovereign of the Seas, the largest passenger vessel afloat at the time. That same year, Royal Caribbean also merged with Admiral Cruises. Two years later in 1990, Nordic Empress and Viking Serenade entered service and Royal Caribbean purchased a second private destination, Little Stirrup Cay, an island in the Bahamas, which they branded as CocoCay.

The second and third s Monarch of the Seas and Majesty of the Seas were delivered in 1991 and 1992 respectively.

Royal Caribbean went public on the New York Stock Exchange in 1993. Over the next two years, the company experienced rapid growth, and it built a new corporate headquarters in Miami, Florida, and replaced the Nordic Prince with a new vessel, the Legend of the Seas.

Following these events, two new  vessels entered service, Splendour of the Seas and Grandeur of the Seas. In 1996, the company contracted with Finland's Aker Finnyards for the construction of 130,000-ton vessels and, in 1997, the line's oldest ship, Song of Norway, was sold and two new Vision-class ships entered service, Rhapsody of the Seas and Enchantment of the Seas.

Reorganisation and renaming 
In 1997, it merged with the Greek cruise line Celebrity Cruises and changed its name from Royal Caribbean Cruise Line to Royal Caribbean International. At the same time, Royal Caribbean Group was formed as Royal Caribbean Cruises Ltd. to serve as a holding company that owned both Celebrity Cruises and Royal Caribbean International. The next year, the last of the company's older vessels, Song of America and Sun Viking, were retired. In 1998, Vision of the Seas came into service, the last of the Vision-class ships.

In 1999, Voyager of the Seas, the line's newest and world's largest cruise ship entered service with much attention from the news media. Two years later, the line took delivery of a second Voyager-class ship, Explorer of the Seas, and the first of a new Radiance class of more environmentally friendly cruise liners, Radiance of the Seas.

In 2000, Royal Caribbean operated a series of land-and-sea-based "cruise tours" in Alaska, featuring glass-domed train cars to scenic destinations within the state and Canada. Over the next two years, they also introduced cruise tours to destinations throughout Europe.

The Voyager-class Navigator of the Seas and the Radiance-class Brilliance of the Seas were put into service in 2002. Mariner of the Seas and Serenade of the Seas, another pair of Voyager and Radiance-class ships, were introduced the next year, and rock-climbing walls were made a feature of every Royal Caribbean ship that year. A fourth Radiance-class ship, Jewel of the Seas, followed in 2004, and the line's Nordic Empress was reconditioned and re-christened as Empress of the Seas, which was later sold to Pullmantur Cruises in 2008. In 2005, Enchantment of the Seas underwent a massive renovation including enlarging the ship with a  midsection.

Freedom of the Seass sister ship, Liberty of the Seas, was launched in 2007, and Independence of the Seas was delivered in 2008.

An even larger class, the Oasis class, featuring Oasis of the Seas and Allure of the Seas, was launched in 2009 and 2010, guaranteeing Royal Caribbean the ship size lead for years to come. In December 2012, Royal Caribbean announced that they had ordered a third Oasis-class cruise ship from STX France, which would be larger than the previous ships in the class. In March 2014, Royal Caribbean announced that they had ordered a fourth Oasis-Class ship from STX France.

In February 2013, Royal Caribbean announced the first two ships of their newest Quantum class, Quantum of the Seas and Anthem of the Seas, which were being built at the Meyer Werft shipyard.  In May of that year, Royal Caribbean announced that they had signed a contract for a third Quantum-class ship for delivery in mid-2016.

In September 2014, Royal Caribbean announced that the third Quantum-class ship would be named Ovation of the Seas, and in February 2015 they announced that the third Oasis-class ship would be named Harmony of the Seas.

In March 2015, Royal Caribbean announced that they had agreed to sell Splendour of the Seas to TUI Cruises in the second quarter of 2016.

In June 2016, Royal Caribbean announced that they had agreed to sell Legend of the Seas to TUI Cruises in the second quarter of 2017.

The company lobbies in various jurisdictions in which it operates. In the United States of America, lobbying expenditure records are held by the Senate Office of Public Records. In South Australia, the company is represented by lobbying company Richardson Coutts Pty Ltd.

In 2017, Royal Caribbean agreed to use Port Everglades as a preferred berth for its Oasis class ships. The new agreement extended the past contract with Port Everglades until 2026, contingent upon a $100 million remodeling of Cruise Terminal 25, and approved by the Broward County Board of County Commissioners.

On 15 March 2018, Royal Caribbean announced that they will conduct a huge renovation for their private island, Coco Cay, which is halfway done with parts opening in December 2018 and early to late 2019 with its first opening in May 2019 and its official opening with everything completed by November or December 2019.

In December 2020, during the COVID-19 pandemic, Royal Caribbean suspended sailings across its fleet. It also sold Empress of the Seas and Majesty of the Seas, with the former going to Cordelia Cruises. , its first and only ship to resume sailing was Quantum of the Seas, which began sailing from Singapore in December 2020 under health and safety regulations formulated by the Singapore government.

On 29 June 2021, Royal Caribbean International's Ovation of the Seas became the first cruise ship to return to the Port of Seattle since the COVID-19 Pandemic began.

Partnerships/capabilities 
In August 2022, the company announced that it would partner with SpaceX to use its Starlink technology across all its ships, in an effort to improve historically weak internet connections. This comes on the heels of the Federal Communications Commission authorizing SpaceX to provide its services to boats, planes, and trucks.

Fleet

Current fleet 
Since Sovereign of the Seas entered service in 1987, all subsequent Royal Caribbean ships have names ending with the phrase "of the Seas".

Vision class

The Vision class consists of three pairs of sister ships. Legend and Splendour, built at Chantiers de l'Atlantique, Saint-Nazaire, France have a gross tonnage of approximately 70,000. Royal Caribbean sold both Splendour of the Seas and Legend of the Seas to Marella Cruises. Splendour of the Seas last sailed for Royal Caribbean on 4 April 2016, and the final Legend of the Seas sailing for Royal Caribbean left port on 13 March 2017. In October 2019, Royal Caribbean announced a plan to transfer Grandeur of the Seas to Pullmantur Cruises after its last scheduled sailing on 21 March 2021. However, following Pullmantur's filing for bankruptcy, Royal Caribbean later announced in August 2020 that Grandeur would remain in Royal Caribbean's fleet.

Voyager class

The Voyager-class ships were the largest class of cruise ships in the world when constructed and were the first ships to have an ice rink at sea and the first to have Royal Caribbean's "Royal Promenade" mall concept, a main thoroughfare extending most of the length of the ship, flanked by bars, cafes, and shopping venues. They were built at Kvaerner Masa-Yards' (now Meyer Turku) facility in Turku, Finland. They have a gross tonnage of around 137,000 tonnes. Activity options onboard all five ships include a basketball court, at least three pools, a mini-golf course, a rock wall, an ice skating rink and, originally, an inline skating track. Navigator of the Seas replaced the inline skating track with a Flowrider surf simulator in 2014, and similar changes are planned for Voyager and Explorer.

Navigator of the Seas and Mariner of the Seas are second-generation Voyager-class vessels, and feature glass stateroom balconies that extend out from the superstructure of the ship and a larger Windjammer buffet area.

Radiance class

All Radiance-class ships have a gross tonnage of 90,090 and environmentally friendlier gas turbine engines. The Radiance class ships were constructed at Meyer Werft, Papenburg, Germany. Unlike the preceding Voyager class, these ships are built to the Panamax form factor, allowing them to pass through the Panama Canal.

Freedom class

The Freedom-class ships are lengthened versions of the second-generation Voyager-class ship, and contain a   Royal Promenade mall running much of the length of the ship, an ice skating rink, basketball court, several pools, a mini-golf course, and a rock wall. New features on the Freedom class include the FlowRider surfing simulator, the H2O Zone kids water play area, a boxing ring, and hot tubs cantilevered over the side of the ship. At 154,407 gross tons, the Freedom-class ships were the largest ships in the world from 2006, until the debut of the Oasis class in 2009.

Oasis class

The Oasis-class ships are the largest passenger ships ever built, having surpassed the Freedom-class ships.  They can accommodate up to 5,400 passengers at double occupancy and they have a maximum capacity of 6,296 passengers. Furthermore, the ships have a gross tonnage of at least 225,282 tons, and cost the line around US$1.4 billion each.
The first two ships in the class, Oasis of the Seas and Allure of the Seas, were delivered in 2009 and 2010 by STX Europe Turku Shipyard, Finland.  The third and fourth ships in the class, Harmony of the Seas and Symphony of the Seas were built at Chantiers de l'Atlantique in Saint-Nazaire, France. They were the first to also come with the Ultimate Abyss.  Royal Caribbean International, in conjunction with USA Today, sponsored a contest to name the first two vessels. On 18 February 2019 Royal Caribbean announced the order of a 6th Oasis class vessel from Chantiers de l'Atlantique for delivery in 2024 with a double occupancy of 5,714 and gross tonnage of 231,000.

Quantum class

The Quantum-class of ships debuted as the second largest class of cruise ships in the world. The Quantum-class ships were the first ships built for Royal Caribbean by Meyer Werft since the Radiance class and share many features with those ships, including indoor pools with retractable roofs, vast expanses of glass, outdoor seating in the "Windjammer" buffet, and self-leveling pool tables. Other distinctive features of the Quantum-class include the "North Star" observation capsule mounted on the end of a  crane arm, "RipCord by iFLY" a skydiving simulator, the three-deck-high Two70° lounge and performance venue at the aft of the ship featuring panoramic windows that convert into projection screens, and the multi-purpose SeaPlex facility which hosts activities such as basketball, roller skating, bumper cars, and a trapeze school. The Quantum class was the first class designed specifically for Dynamic Dining, and feature several separate complementary dining facilities instead of a single main dining room.  Each venue will maintain the same menu and staff throughout the cruise. Unlike the earlier Voyager, Freedom, and Oasis class, Quantum-class ships do not feature a Viking Crown Lounge or ice skating rink, and the Royal Promenade mall down the center of the ship is not featured in its traditional form.

Four ships, Quantum of the Seas, Anthem of the Seas, Ovation of the Seas, and Spectrum of the Seas were built as of 2019. A fifth ship, Odyssey of the Seas was delivered in March 2021.

Future fleet

Former fleet

Private resorts
Royal Caribbean operates two privately owned resorts that are used as stops on some Caribbean and Bahamas itineraries. They are Labadee, a resort on the northern coast of Haiti, and Coco Cay, a private island in the Berry Islands region of the Bahamas. Each resort features canopies for eating, lounge chairs, palm trees, white sand beaches, and a number of activities.

The company is planning to open additional private resorts in Asia and on Lelepa Island, Vanuatu.

Ports of call 
Royal Caribbean operates internationally and has many ports of call.

US ports 
United States ports for Royal Caribbean include Port Everglades in Fort Lauderdale, Florida, Cape Liberty Cruise Port, Honolulu Harbor, PortMiami, the Port of Seattle, the Port of Galveston in Galveston, Texas, the Port of Los Angeles, the Port of New Orleans, the Port of San Diego, the Port of Seward in Seward, Alaska, the Port of Baltimore, the Port of Boston, Port Canaveral in Cape Canaveral, Florida, and Port Tampa Bay in Tampa, Florida, Port of San Juan in San Juan, Puerto Rico.

International ports 
Among these are the Port of Amsterdam, the Port of Barcelona, the Port of Quebec, the Port of Shenzhen, the Port of Stockholm, the Port of Vancouver, the Port of Auckland, the Port of Beijing, the Port of Civitavecchia, the Port of Singapore, the Port of Sydney, the Port of Venice, the Port of Copenhagen, the Port of Hong Kong, the Port of Melbourne, the Port of Shanghai, and the Port of Southampton. Marmagao Port,  Goa.

Awards

2019 and 2020 Awards
The cruise line has been presented with more than 100 notable awards during the course of 2019 and 2020.

Previous Travel awards include
 "Best Cruise Line Overall" 2016 by Travel Weekly
"Cruise Line of the Year 2018" by Cruisedaily

Incidents and controversies

As of 2008, Royal Caribbean had 22% of the market share in cruise line operation. Cruise line operators are criticized for using this large economic impact to cut deals with home ports, ports of call, and agencies.

Norovirus outbreaks 
In January 2014, an outbreak of norovirus aboard Explorer of the Seas sickened 689 of 4,237 passengers and crew (16.3%), causing the ship to return to port two days early. The outbreak reportedly marked the greatest number of cases of illness aboard a cruise ship in two decades, barely exceeding a 2006 outbreak aboard the Carnival Cruise Lines' Carnival Liberty that sickened 679 of 3,970 passengers and crew (17.1%). Royal Caribbean offered all passengers aboard that cruise a 50% refund of their cruise fare, an additional 50% (plus 10% for each day sick passengers were quarantined) of their cruise fare as a credit towards another cruise, and reimbursed extra travel expenses for guests returning home early.

Docking in Haiti
In the aftermath of the 2010 Haiti earthquake, Royal Caribbean continued docking cruise ships at the Labadee resort, located approximately 60 miles from the epicenter of the earthquake, during the ongoing humanitarian crisis. Royal Caribbean vice president John Weis defended the decision, citing relief supplies delivered through the ships and proceeds from the call going towards relief efforts. The decision to continue docking was criticized nonetheless and created concern among passengers.

George Allen Smith case

On 5 July 2005, passengers on board Brilliance of the Seas reported what appeared to be blood on a part of the ship below the passenger balconies. After a search, George Allen Smith was discovered to be missing and thought to have fallen overboard. A criminal investigation into possible foul play was conducted, and a brief press release on the company's investor relations website announced the settlement of the case, later revealed to be more than $1 million.

Environmental record
In 1998 and 1999, the company was fined US$9 million because one of its ships, Sovereign of the Seas, had repeatedly dumped oily waste into the ocean and tried to hide this using false records, including fake piping diagrams given to the US Coast Guard. Because the company was and is incorporated in Liberia, Royal Caribbean argued that this case was not in the jurisdiction of US courts. Despite their argument, they were unsuccessful.

Whakaari / White Island eruption

It occurred on New Zealand's Whakaari / White Island while Ovation was docked in the nearby Port of Tauranga. Despite an increase in seismic activity in preceding weeks 47 people, including 38 passengers and crew from the ship, were on the island when it erupted. , 44 of the 47 were injured, missing, or killed. A Royal Caribbean spokesperson said the line was "devastated by today’s events", and the ship remained in port until 10 December to assist with recovery efforts. In April 2020, legal action was commenced in Australia on behalf of relatives and Ovation passengers against Royal Caribbean.

Death of Chloe Rae Margaret Wiegand 

On 7 July 2019, 18-month-old Chloe Rae Margaret Wiegand was dropped to her death from an open window by her grandfather Salvatore Anello on  while docked in San Juan, Puerto Rico. He was later arrested on counts of homicide by authorities in Puerto Rico. The family attempted to file a civil suit against Royal Caribbean claiming that Anello did not know the window was open. Royal Caribbean later released several videos from surveillance cameras showing the incident. As of 25 February 2020, Anello took a plea deal with authorities, however the civil lawsuit was still approved by a judge.

COVID-19 pandemic 

During the COVID-19 pandemic, the Miami Herald reported that, after cruises were cancelled worldwide and they had disembarked all passengers, Royal Caribbean Cruises had refused to repatriate many of their crew members due to the associated costs, with many crew members turning to desperate measures, such as hunger strikes, as a result.

As part of the Cruise Line International Association (CLIA), Royal Caribbean has volunteered to pause operations through 31 October 2020. Previously, the pause was to end on 15 September 2020.

At the end of October 2020, Royal Caribbean extended its global sailing suspension through December 2020. That suspension was then extended through 30 April 2021.

On 16 June 2021, Royal Caribbean International announced that it was delaying the inaugural sailing of their newest cruise liner, Odyssey of the Seas after eight crew members tested positive for SARS-CoV-2–COVID-19. Six of the crew members were without showing signs of symptoms while the other two were experiencing mild symptoms of the disease. The delay was extended until 31 July 2021.

References

External links

 
Cruise lines
Royal Caribbean Group
Companies based in Miami
Norwegian companies established in 1968